The 2002–03 Oklahoma State Cowboys basketball team represented Oklahoma State University as a member of the Big 12 Conference during the 2002–03 NCAA Division I men's basketball season. They were led by 13th-year head coach Eddie Sutton and played their home games at Gallagher-Iba Arena in Stillwater, Oklahoma. They finished the season 22–10, 10–6 in Big 12 play to finish in fourth place. The Cowboys lost to Missouri in the quarterfinals of the Big 12 tournament. The team received an at-large bid to the NCAA tournament as the No. 6 seed in the East region. Oklahoma State beat Penn in the opening round, but lost to No. 3 seed and eventual National champion Syracuse in the second round.

Roster

Source:

Schedule and results

|-
!colspan=9 style=| Regular season

|-
!colspan=9 style=| Big 12 Tournament

|-
!colspan=9 style=| NCAA Tournament

Rankings

References

Oklahoma State Cowboys basketball seasons
Oklahoma State
2002 in sports in Oklahoma
2003 in sports in Oklahoma
Oklahoma State